Janssen Willhoit is an American politician who served in the Vermont House of Representatives from 2015 to 2019.

References

Living people
Eastern Kentucky University alumni
Vermont Law and Graduate School alumni
George Washington University alumni
21st-century American politicians
Members of the Vermont House of Representatives
People from Cynthiana, Kentucky
Year of birth missing (living people)